Group A of the 2003 Fed Cup Americas Zone Group II was one of two pools in the Americas Zone Group II of the 2003 Fed Cup. Five teams competed in a round robin competition, with the top team advancing to Group I in 2004.

Costa Rica vs. Ecuador

Dominican Republic vs. Puerto Rico

Puerto Rico vs. Ecuador

Venezuela vs. Dominican Republic

Venezuela vs. Costa Rica

Dominican Republic vs. Ecuador

Venezuela vs. Ecuador

Costa Rica vs. Puerto Rico

Venezuela vs. Puerto Rico

Costa Rica vs. Dominican Republic

  placed first in the pool, and thus advanced to Group I in 2003, where they placed equal sixth out of the overall nine.

See also
Fed Cup structure

References

External links
 Fed Cup website

2003 Fed Cup Americas Zone